Trinder is a surname. Notable people with the surname include:

Aaron Trinder (born 1980), Australian rugby league player
Henry Trinder (born 1989), English rugby union player
Oliver Trinder (1907–1981), British Olympic fencer
Tommy Trinder CBE (1909–1989), English stage, screen and radio comedian of the pre and post war years

See also
Trinder glucose activity test, diagnostic test used in medicine to determine the presence of glucose or glucose oxidase
Trinder Park railway station, railway station on the Beenleigh Line of Brisbane, Australia
Trinder spot test, diagnostic test used in medicine to determine exposure to salicylates, particularly to salicylic acid